The Nationalist Democratic Movement was a political party based in the Nagaland, India. It was recognised as a state party and its chief was K. L. Chishi. The party symbol was a torch (flashlight). It merged with BJP.

References

Political parties in Nagaland
Political parties with year of establishment missing
Political parties with year of disestablishment missing